Rorippa curvisiliqua is a species of flowering plant in the family Brassicaceae known by the common name curvepod yellowcress.

It is native to western North America from Alaska to California to Wyoming. It is also native to the northwest part of Mexico. It can be found in various types of moist and wet habitat, including lakeshores and riverbanks, meadows, roadsides, and mudflats.

Description
Rorippa curvisiliqua is an annual or biennial herb which can be quite variable in appearance. It produces prostrate to erect stems up to half a meter long. The leaves are up to 7 centimeters long and have blades which may be smooth-edged or divided into lobes of varying shapes.

The inflorescence is an elongated raceme occupying the top portion of the stem containing many tiny yellow flowers just a few millimeters long.

The fruit is a silique which is variable in size and shape but generally contains many minute seeds.

This species has been divided into a number of varieties, but some authorities doubt that this division is valid or useful.

References

External links
Jepson Manual Treatment of Rorippa curvisiliqua
USDA Plants Profile for Rorippa curvisiliqua
Rorippa curvisiliqua — U.C. Photo gallery

curvisiliqua
Flora of Alaska
Flora of British Columbia
Flora of California
Flora of Idaho
Flora of Montana
Flora of Nevada
Flora of Oregon
Flora of Wyoming
Flora of the Cascade Range
Flora of the Klamath Mountains
Flora of the Sierra Nevada (United States)
Flora of the West Coast of the United States
Natural history of the California chaparral and woodlands
Natural history of the California Coast Ranges
Natural history of the Central Valley (California)
Natural history of the Santa Monica Mountains
Natural history of the Transverse Ranges
Flora without expected TNC conservation status